Peperomia veneciana is a species of epiphyte from the genus Peperomia. They primarily grow in wet tropical biomes. It was discovered by William Trelease and Truman G. Yuncker in 1950.

Etymology
veneciana came from the locality "Venecia-pandi". This refers to the species being discovered in the locality.

Distribution
Peperomia veneciana is native to Colombia. Specimens can be found at 1050 meters.

Colombia
Cundinamarca
Venecia-pandi

References

veneciana
Flora of South America
Flora of Colombia
Plants described in 1950
Taxa named by William Trelease
Taxa named by Truman G. Yuncker